Angélica Souza (born 11 February 1979) is a Uruguayan footballer who plays as a forward for Rampla Juniors. She has been a member of the Uruguay women's national team.

Club career
Souza played in Uruguay for Peñarol, Cerro, Rampla Juniors, River Plate and Nacional.

International career
Souza capped for Uruguay at senior level during two Copa América Femenina editions (2003 and 2006).

International goals
Scores and results list Uruguay's goal tally first

References 

1979 births
Living people
Footballers from Montevideo
Uruguayan women's footballers
Women's association football forwards
Peñarol players
C.A. Cerro players
Rampla Juniors players
Club Atlético River Plate (Montevideo) players
Club Nacional de Football players
Uruguay women's international footballers